Stephen Young (born Stephen Levy; May 19, 1939) is a retired Canadian actor and television host.

Biography

Young was born in Toronto, Ontario, Canada to a financier father. Directly following high school at Forest Hill Collegiate Institute where he was student president, he signed with the Cleveland Indians, but his professional bid ended when he seriously injured his knee playing ice hockey. He spent the next few years as a salesman, then wound up in radio and TV commercial production.

While travelling with a friend on a European excursion in the early 1960s, Young by chance got a bit part in the epic Cleopatra, then landed similar minor assignments in such other European-filmed epics as 55 Days at Peking, The Leopard, The Fall of the Roman Empire and The Thin Red Line.

Upon returning to Toronto, Young decided to become a full-time actor, originally billing himself under his birth name and appearing in leads on both daytime and primetime TV dramas. He headed the cast of the Canadian adventure series Seaway.

Moving to Hollywood in 1966, he subsequently starred as young lawyer Ben Caldwell, assistant to high-profile criminal attorney Clinton Judd (Carl Betz) in the drama Judd, for the Defense. The series was abruptly cancelled after only two seasons. Stephen Young also co-starred in the cult science fiction TV series The Starlost (episode #11-'Astro-Medics') in 1973. 
Young progressed to high-ranking character actor, working in such films as Patton, Soylent Green, and The Silent Partner with appearances in lower-budget projects like The Mask of Sheba, Rage, and Lifeguard. He continued to return to Canada from time to time, where he played leads in the low-budget horror thrillers The Clown Murders and Deadline. Young also briefly hosted a 1980s Canadian game show, Just Like Mom.

Young slowed his activity entering the millennium, with his final appearance in the 2013 low budget independent film The Angel Inn.

Filmography

55 Days at Peking (1963) as Dying British Marine (uncredited)
The Thin Red Line (1964) as Stack
Don't Forget to Wipe the Blood Off (1966) (two part episode of Seaway released as a feature film)
The President's Analyst (1967) as Man in Suit Killed With a Knife in the Beginning of the Movie (uncredited)
John and Mary (1969) as Daytime Bartender (uncredited)
Patton (1970) as Captain Chester B. Hansen
Rage (1972) as Maj. Reintz
Soylent Green (1973) as Gilbert
Breaking Point (1976) as Peter Stratas
Lifeguard (1976) as Larry
The Clown Murders (1976) as Charlie
Hawaii Five-O "To Die in Paradise" (1977) as Quincy
The Little Dragons (1979) as Lunsford
Hart to Hart "Homemade Murder" (1981) as Sergeant Cosgrove
Spring Fever (1982) as Neil Berryman
Deadline (1984) as Steven Lessey
Not Another Mistake (1988) as Jasper
Who's Harry Crumb? (1989) as Interior Decorator
The Gumshoe Kid (1990) as Cop
In The Heat of the Night (1991) as Mike Lawrence
Scorned (1994) as Mason Wainwright
The Rendering (2002) as Det. Nick Sousa
Charlie Bartlett (2007) as Dr. Stan Weathers
The Angel Inn (2013) as Arrogant Bum (final role)

References

External links
 

1939 births
Living people
Canadian male film actors
Canadian male television actors
Male actors from Toronto